State of Mind is a 2018 graphic adventure game developed and published by Daedalic Entertainment. A cyberpunk story set in the near future, the game explores transhumanist themes. The game was released for Windows, Linux, PlayStation 4, Nintendo Switch and Xbox One in August 2018. It received mixed reviews upon release.

Gameplay 
The game is played through a third-person perspective. There is no combat involved in the game, instead gameplay mostly revolves around interacting with other characters, solving puzzles and doing mini games. Many things in the world can be scanned and interacted with, which gives the player information about items in the world. Players can, for example, interact with photos of the main character Richard's family. The game also focuses on exploring a wide variety of locations.

Plot 
State of Mind unfolds in Berlin in 2048 and revolves around Richard Nolan, a journalist waking up in a hospital after an explosion, finding out that his family is nowhere to be found. Nolan soon realizes that the world has changed and that technology is taking over. The game focuses on the impact that AI and technology have on humans, as well as coming to terms with in what manner super AI- can adapt to human behavior. The main character in the game, Richard Nolan, is voiced by Doug Cockle, most notable for being the voice actor of Geralt of Rivia in The Witcher video game series.

Development
Development of State of Mind was led by Martin Ganteföhr, creator of the 2004 adventure game The Moment of Silence. Production began in 2015. The game was developed with Unreal Engine 4. State of Mind features a low-poly art style inspired in part by the visuals of That Dragon, Cancer. According to Daedalic's Kai Fiebig, the art style was Ganteföhr's idea, as the fragmented look reflected the game's themes in its portrayal of "a shattered person, a shattered society on the edge of change." The game was released on Nintendo Switch on August 15, 2018 in the west and on November 8, 2018 in Japan.

Reception

State of Mind received mixed to positive reviews from video game critics. Aggregating review website Metacritic gave the PC version 69/100, the PlayStation 4 version 67/100, the Xbox One version 73/100 and the Nintendo Switch version 63/100.

Writing for Adventure Gamers, Pascal Takaia gave the game a mixed review, praising the transhumanist themes and voice acting, while criticizing the game's narrative, puzzles and characters. Conversely, Jeuxvideo.com gave the game a positive review, particularly praising the game's visuals, story and themes. Roy Woodhouse of Gamereactor acclaimed the game for its gripping sci-fi world and he implied that the game is "thought-provoking and provides emotional and engaging narrative", although calling the puzzles in the game "a little weak". Writing for GameStar, Robin Rüther praised the graphics but criticised the lack of challenge and the mini games. Paula Sprödefeld of PC Games, gave the game 82/100 and commended the story and graphics, while mentioning some complaints regarding the controls. 

Conversely, Dom Reseigh-Lincoln of Nintendo Life, gave the game a mixed review, saying that " State of Mind has its moments to shine - certain plot beats in the final act do offer some genuine payoff, and some of those visuals are a joy to see running in docked mode or in handheld - but they’re too often lost in a mire of storytelling cliche and science fiction tropes you’ve seen done better countless times before. A set of in-game achievements do help break up the lengthy plot, but the awkward voice acting and lack of cohesion between its gameplay ideas ultimately make for a muddled experience at best ". Writing for VideoGamer, Josh Wish praised the story as well as the art style, while mentioning the puzzles and some story related cliches as negative aspects of the game. Moreover, Jan Wöbbeking of 4players, gave the PC version of the game 69/100, commending the story but criticizing the mini games as well as the portrayal of characters.

References

External links

2018 video games
Adventure games
Daedalic Entertainment games
Nintendo Switch games
PlayStation 4 games
Unreal Engine games
Video games developed in Germany
Video games set in Berlin
Video games set in New York City
Video games set in New York (state)
Windows games
Xbox One games
Transhumanism in fiction
Cyberpunk video games
Linux games